Florian Gerard Kempf (born May 25, 1956) is a former American football placekicker  who played four seasons in the National Football League with the Houston Oilers and New Orleans Saints. He played college football at the University of Pennsylvania and attended Cardinal Dougherty High School in Philadelphia, Pennsylvania. Kempf also played soccer for the Philadelphia Fury of the North American Soccer League and the Pennsylvania Stoners of the American Soccer League.

References

External links
Just Sports Stats
NASL/ASL stats
Just Sports Stats soccer
Fanbase profile

Living people
1956 births
Players of American football from Philadelphia
American football placekickers
Footballers who switched code
Penn Quakers men's soccer players
Pennsylvania Stoners players
Philadelphia Fury (1978–1980) players
Penn Quakers football players
Houston Oilers players
New Orleans Saints players
North American Soccer League (1968–1984) players
American Soccer League (1933–1983) players
Soccer players from Philadelphia
Association football midfielders
American soccer players
National Football League replacement players
Association football players that played in the NFL